Guaranteed may refer to:
 Guaranteed (Morris Day album)
 Guaranteed (Ronnie Drew album)
 Guaranteed (Phatfish album)
 "Guaranteed" (Eddie Vedder song)
 Guaranteed (Level 42 album)
 "Guaranteed" (Level 42 song)